Pseudamnicola brachia is a species of very small freshwater snail with an operculum, an aquatic gastropod mollusc in the family Hydrobiidae.

Distribution 
P. brachia is endemic to Greece, where it occurs on the island of Crete.

References

Hydrobiidae
Gastropods of Europe
Endemic fauna of Crete
Gastropods described in 1886